Kaliveedu is a 1996 Malayalam family drama film directed by Sibi Malayil. It stars Jayaram, Manju Warrier, Jagadish, Sunitha and Vani Viswanath in lead roles. The film explores the marital relationship of Mahesh (Jayaram) and Mridula (Manju Warrier) and their lives following their divorce.

Plot

The film begins with Mahesh who is an architect/interior designer by profession in a reputed company. Ulahannan is a site supervisor in the same company. Ulahannan, Dr. Gonzales and Mahesh are good friends. Yamini is a modern girl from USA who wishes to settle down in Kerala and approaches Mahesh for designing her house. Upon her father's insistence Yamini wishes to marry Mahesh but is surprised to know that Mahesh is already married to a dancer named Mridula.

Mahesh reveals that he was very disciplined due to his upbringing in a military family . Mahesh used to regularly exercise, wake up early, read newspapers and keep his house/clothes clean. Mahesh wanted a wife who is disciplined and who would be proactive in looking after her husband's needs and advise in his job related designs. However Mridula fails to  meet his expectations. 
One day a servant, Oormila, is hired. Oormila takes active interest in Mahesh's activities and lives up to his expectations. Mahesh is highly impressed with Oormila. However, this annoys Mridula when she realises that Oormila is in fact Ulahannan's wife. Oormila was hired to make Mridula realise the responsibilities of a wife. An angry Mridula leaves the house after a heated argument and they file for a divorce.

Yamini after hearing his story suggests to Mahesh that they live together for a few days (without any physical relationship) and if convinced mutually, they would get married. Mahesh agrees for the same. Mahesh soon realises that Yamini is not a match for him and Mridula was in fact a better life partner. On the other hand, Yamini is very happy and is convinced of marrying Mahesh. Seeing her happiness Mahesh reluctantly agrees for the marriage.

At the marriage registrar's office Mahesh is surprised to see Mridula. Yamini explains that for any happy married life each partner must adjust with each other, knowing each other's shortcomings and never be over disciplined.  Yamini informs Mahesh to remarry Mridula since they both love each other.  Finally Mridula and Mahesh get married again.

Cast

References

External links
 

1996 films
1996 comedy-drama films
1990s Malayalam-language films
Indian comedy-drama films
Films scored by Mohan Sithara